Major Lance's Greatest Hits Recorded Live at the Torch is an album by the soul artist Major Lance, released in 1973 on Contempo Records. It was recorded live in front of a sell-out audience  at the Torch, Tunstall, Stoke-On-Trent, on 9 December 1972 and has been described as "perhaps the best Northern soul album ever made", and "a one-off gig when everything came together in perfect harmony".

Track listing

References

1973 live albums
Live albums by American artists